The following outline is provided as an overview of and topical guide to the planet Earth:

Earth – third planet from the Sun, the densest planet in the Solar System, the largest of the Solar System's four terrestrial planets, and the only astronomical object known to harbor life.

Classification of Earth 

 Astronomical object
 Gravitationally rounded object
 Planet
 Planet of the Solar System
 Inner planet
 Terrestrial planet

Location of Earth 
Earth's location in the Universe
 Universe – all of time and space and its contents.
 Observable universe – spherical region of the Universe comprising all matter that may be observed from Earth at the present time, because light and other signals from these objects have had time to reach Earth since the beginning of the cosmological expansion.
 Laniakea Supercluster – galaxy supercluster that is home to the Milky Way and approximately 100,000 other nearby galaxies. Includes the prior defined local supercluster, the Virgo Supercluster, as an appendage.
 Virgo Supercluster – one of the approximately 10 million superclusters in the observable universe. It spans 33 megaparsecs (110 million light-years), and contains at least 100 galaxy groups and clusters, including the Local Group.
 Local Group – specific galaxy group that includes the Milky Way and at least 53 other  galaxies, most of them dwarf galaxies.
 Milky Way Galaxy – a specific barred spiral galaxy
 Orion Arm – a spiral arm of the Milky Way
 Solar System – the Sun and the objects that orbit it, including eight planets, the third planet closest to the Sun being Earth
 Earth's orbit – path through which the Earth travels around the Sun. The average distance between the Earth and the Sun is 149.60 million kilometers (92.96 million miles).

Movement of the Earth 
 Earth's orbit
 Earth's rotation
 Earth's precession

Features of Earth 
 Age of the Earth
 Figure of the Earth (size and shape)
 Earth radius
 Models of the Earth
 Globe
 World map
 Gravity of Earth
 Earth's magnetic field
 Natural environment

Earth's spheres

Atmosphere of Earth

Earth's biosphere 
 Ecosystems
 Biomes
 biogeographic realms
 Marine realms
 Bioregions
 Ecoregions (list)
 Anthroposphere
 Noosphere

Earth's geosphere 
 Structure of the Earth
 Earth's surface
 Lithosphere of Earth (solid Earth)
 Earth's crust
 Land
 Landforms (list)
 Continents
 Africa
 Antarctica
 Asia
 Australia
 Europe
 North America
 South America
 Pedosphere
 Ocean floor
 Earth's mantle
 Earth's core
 Outer core
 Inner core

Earth's hydrosphere 
This sphere represents all water on Earth, wherever it is and in whatever form within the  water cycle.
 Water, by relative altitude

Atmospheric water 
 Water vapor
 Clouds
 Precipitation

Cryosphere (frozen water) 
 Polar ice caps
 Ice sheets
 Ice caps
 Glaciers

Surface water 
 Bodies of water (list)
 World Ocean
 Southern Ocean
 Oceans - This includes the Earth's five oceans: The Arctic Ocean, the Atlantic Ocean, the Indian Ocean, and the Pacific Ocean.
 Groundwater

Water, by salt content 
 Fresh water
 Brackish water
 Seawater

Astronomical events on Earth 
 Meteor showers (list)
 Meteorite falls
 Tides
 Eclipse - This includes both a lunar eclipse and  solar eclipse.
 Equinox - This includes both the  March equinox and the  September equinox.
 Solstice - This includes the Summer solstice,  June solstice, Winter solstice, and  December solstice
 Manhattanhenge

Natural satellites of Earth 
 Moon

History of Earth 

History of Earth
 Age of the Earth
 Geocentric model
 Geological history of Earth
 Geologic time scale
 Early Earth
 Timeline of natural history
 Human history

Future of Earth 

Future of Earth
 Climate change
 Global catastrophic risk

See also 

 Earth and atmospheric sciences journals
 Earth phase
 Earth sciences
 List of fields of science that study the Earth
 Geoscience organizations
 List of environmental organizations 
 Outline of the Solar System
 World

References

External links 

 National Geographic encyclopedic entry about Earth
 Earth – Profile – Solar System Exploration – NASA
 Earth – Climate Changes Cause Shape to Change – NASA
 United States Geological Survey – USGS
 Earth – Astronaut Photography Gateway – NASA
 Earth Observatory – NASA
 Earth – Audio (29:28) – Cain/Gay – Astronomy Cast (2007)
 Earth – Videos – International Space Station:
 Video (01:02) – Earth (time-lapse)
 Video (00:27) – Earth and Auroras (time-lapse)

Earth
Earth